Torno may refer to:

Places
Bolivia
El Torno, Santa Cruz, a town

Denmark 
Tornø, a small island in the Odense Fjord of Funen

Italy 
Torno (river), a river in the Province of Reggio Calabria
Torno, Lombardy, a comune in the Province of Como

Portugal 
Torno, Portugal, a freguesia in the municipio of Lousada, Porto
Vilar do Torno e Alentém, a freguesia in the municipio of Lousada, Porto

Romania
 Tornó, the Hungarian name for Târnova Commune, Caraş-Severin County

Spain
El Torno, a municipality in the province of Cáceres

Other
Nelson Torno (born 1927), Argentine sports shooter